Trio is a South Korean television drama produced by the MBC in 2002. The drama has a total of 17 episodes.

Synopsis
Park, Jang and Roh were bosom friends as youths, along with Sa-yeong and Miri. Park and Jang later became entrepreneurs when they grew up.

One day, in Kuala Lumpur, Malaysia, Park and his company encountered gangsters who attempted assassination upon him. The company, one driving in a Perak-registered turquoise Volvo and the other in a Kuala-Lumpur registered bluish-purple Proton Wira was chased by one gangster on a motorbike and his company. As they drove through a road surrounded by woods, the company stopped their car and took out their revolvers to shoot the gangsters, and hit the one riding on a motorbike, who fell off as he was riding on it. Meanwhile, the gangster's Malay accomplices attempted to restart the car.

Da-yeong faced several reporters who interviewed him about the ordeal. As he was about to enter the (black) car, an assassin hiding in the bushes fired his sniper, and the bullet hit right on Da-yeong's head. Jun-ki, whose face was splashed with his father's blood, shouted out and carried his mortally wounded father who was staggering.

Final episode
The trio were being pursued after by Ahn's gangsters, and were being beaten up by gangsters when Ahn learnt that the tape containing his secret message. Park was nearly strangled to death by a gangster, but was being saved by Roh. Back home, his (newly-wed) wife Sa-yeong put the videotape into his coat. As Park saw his mother off, they reminded each other to take care of themselves.

Later, Bum-soo was driving a quiet road and was being pursued by two gangsters on a motorbike. Jun-ki's mother was being robbed of the videotape, and Bum-soo, stopped his car as the gangsters smashed his windscreen. He was being beaten up, and the gangsters left. Jun-ki and Ji-mun later faced a similar fate by gangsters riding on two heavy trucks. The videotaped was being trampled and they were being beaten up, before the gangsters left.

Ahn overheard Miri's conversation with Bum-soo outside the office, and ordered his henchman to drug her at the carpark. She was being drugged at the carpark as she was opening her car door. She was taken to the beach, and was forced to call the trio, starting from Bum-soo, claiming that she had found evidence of Ahn's statements. When she called Jun-ki and Ji-mun, Jun-ki urged Ji-mun to get to the scheduled location immediately, who hesitated.

Bum-soo arrived at the scheduled location, who felt rather puzzled to why Miri had asked to meet at such a desolate place. The gangsters, hiding below the seats of their car. Miri tried to whisper to him to escape, who couldn't comprehend what she was trying to convene. A car then came charging towards them, and Miri pushed Bum-soo away, herself getting hit instead, smashing the car's windscreen. At this time, Jun-ki and Ji-mun came rushing, with the police following behind. The gangsters put up a short fight before leaving the scene, and Jun-ki gave a very brief chase. Jun-ki discovered Dong-kwon in the car, and locked him in handcuffs. As he searched his pockets, he managed to seize a pager containing the statements Dong-kwon spoke.

Bum-soo ran towards Miri, who was lying on the floor with a big gash on her forehead. In Bum-soo's arms, Miri whispered to the trio, of which Bum-soo and Jun-ki rushed near the couple to hear her final words. Miri died, and Bum-soo burst into tears. Bum-soo and Jun-ki looked very solemn upon their friend's death.

Back home, Jun-ki told his wife that all evidence had been destroyed, and expressed his displeasure. His wife took out a DVD casing meant to hold the DVD of an action film, and opened out to a video cassette. She told him that she had made a backup copy, and Jun-ki hugged her in his arms.

At the court, in front of the media, Bum-soo publicised Dong-kwon's statement in the pager, by playing the audio clip and playing it near the microphone. His statement was heard by everybody in the court, and also showed a video tape of Dong-kwon's atrocities. Bum-soo continued his statement of Dong-kwon's criminal activities in Korea and Malaysia, and that he would resort to all means to end corruption, even at the expense of the death his most beloved girlfriend and Jun-ki's father Da-yeong.

Later, Jun-ki and Ji-mun accompanied Bum-soo to scatter Miri's ashes along the riverbank. He expressed that he wished that Miri would not suffer the winter wind as he scattered the ashes. The two friends, standing behind, looked rather solemn in their black coats. Afterwards, they made a promise to help each other in times of need, and the trio knocked their knuckles against one another. (The story ends here)

Cast
 Ryu Jin as Park Jun-ki
 Baek Sung-hyun as young Jun-ki
 Son Ji-chang as Jang Bum-soo
 Lee Jung-jin as Roh Ji-mun
 Kim So-yeon as Choi Seo-young
 Hwang In-young as Jeong Miri
 Jeong Wook as Lee Da-yeong
 Jang Yong as Ahn Dong-kwon
 Jung Da-bin as Jang Yoon-jung (Bum-soo's sister)
 Yu Ji-in as Park Jung-hae (Jun-ki's mother)
 Kim Young-ok as Bum-soo's grandmother
 Kim Chang-sook as Soo-young's mother
 Lee Jung-hoon as Kim Hyung-joo
 Suh Hyun-suk as Oh Hyun-tae
 Kim So-won

References

External links
 Trio official MBC website 
 Trio at Koreanwiz
 Trio at CineSeoul 

MBC TV television dramas
2002 South Korean television series debuts
2003 South Korean television series endings
Korean-language television shows
South Korean action television series